Ivar Grande (28 April 1911 – 11 December 1944) was a police officer and Gestapo agent in Trondheim, Norway during World War II. He was second-in-command of the group Sonderabteilung Lola, led by Henry Rinnan. Grande was responsible for the unveiling of several resistance groups, by infiltration of the groups. He escaped several assassination attempts by the resistance movement, but was eventually shot and killed in Ålesund on 11 December 1944, by SOE personnel or local Milorg members.

He was married to Kitty Grande, another member of Sonderabteilung Lola.

References

1911 births
1944 deaths
Assassinated Nazis
Assassinated Norwegian people
Assassinated police officers
Deaths by firearm in Norway
Gestapo agents
Norwegian collaborators with Nazi Germany
Norwegian police officers